Governor's Bridge is an historic  single-lane bridge over the Patuxent River near Bowie, Maryland. The river marks the boundary between Prince George's and Anne Arundel counties.   A bridge has been located on this site since the mid-18th century.

Although a common bridge type, the current Governor's Bridge is one of only two surviving truss bridges in Prince George's County.

History
Three bridges have stood on this site.

The first bridge was constructed by Governor Samuel Ogle to travel between his mansion in Collington and the state capital in Annapolis.

By 1817, the first bridge had been damaged beyond repair or destroyed and a ford was being used to traverse the river at the site.   On February 4, 1817, the  State of Maryland commissioned Joseph N. Stockett and James Sanders of Anne Arundel County to build a new Governor's Bridge.

Current bridge
The current truss bridge was constructed in 1912.

The bridge was repaired in 2014 after structural deficiencies were discovered during a routine inspection. It was closed in May 2013, underwent major repairs starting in January 2014, and reopened in March 2014.

The bridge closed March 30, 2015, after contractors inspected the bridge and determined it required emergency repairs. In 2016, Prince George's County announced that the bridge was scheduled to reopen in 2019.  In October 2018, the county held a public meeting to describe six different proposals for repairing or replacing the bridge. In September 2019, the county held a public meeting to review feedback on the alternatives. As of March 2020, the Prince George's County Capital Roadway and Bridge Projects web site stated that reconstruction was still in the planning stages.

See also
List of bridges documented by the Historic American Engineering Record in Maryland

References

External links

Bridges in Anne Arundel County, Maryland
Bridges in Prince George's County, Maryland
Bridges completed in 1907
Historic American Engineering Record in Maryland
Landmarks in Maryland
Road bridges in Maryland
Steel bridges in the United States
Pratt truss bridges in the United States
Patuxent River